Gaston Petrus Bernardina Berghmans (11 March 1926 – 21 May 2016) was a Belgian actor and comedian. Between 1972 and 1993 he and Leo Martin formed a comic duo called Gaston and Leo.

Youth

Gaston Berghmans was the eldest son in a family with two children. His sister, Paula, is four years younger and has lived  in the U.S. since 1959. Berghmans's father was an independent diamond cutter, his mother worked as an assistant in her sister's butcher shop.

Early career

He performed at the Ancienne Belgique concert hall.

He married in 1960; his daughter was born in 1961.

Early film career
In the late 1950s he also appeared in several films directed by Flemish comic Jan Vanderheyden:

 Een zonde waard "Worth a sin"
 Den duivel te slim "Too smart for the devil"
 Hoe zotter hoe liever "The crazier the better"
 De stille genieter "The quiet enjoyer"

They were all successful in Flanders and increased Gaston's reputation and work efforts.

Gaston and Leo

Gaston first met Leo Martin in 1957 in the Billiard Palace, where the orchestra of Willy Rockin played. Martin played the saxophone and clarinet and Gaston performed sketches with him. In the 1960s Martin got his own orchestra and it became easier to invite Gaston to come perform sketches. Their performances were often comic prologues for Martin's musical moments. These performances were the foundation for what would be later evolve into their double act Gaston and Leo.

In 1972 Martin's band broke up and the two men became a successful comedic duo.

BRT
From 1972 Gaston and Leo also appeared on the state-owned Belgische Radio- en Televisieomroep (BRT) television network, including some New Year's Eve special broadcasts.

They also made four films together: The boat to Spain (1982) (director: Willy Vanduren), Thugs (1984) (director: Robbe De Hert), The Panic Sowers (1986) (director: Patrick Lebon) and Gaston en Leo in Hong Kong (1988) (director: Paul Cammermans).

VTM
They left BRT for commercial broadcaster vtm (Vlaamse Televisie Maatschappij).

Both comedians had health problems. Berghmans got cancer and had to walk around with a stoma. Martin got lung cancer and died on 18 March 1993. Six months earlier they had appeared in the VTM show 20 years of Gaston and Leo which was presented by Luc Appermont.

After Martin's death
Martin's death was a severe blow to Berghmans as his partner was irreplaceable. On the occasion of his 80th birthday on 6 December 2006 VTM aired a program titled Gaston 80. In 2008 he appeared in the movie Christmas in Paris. The film was an artistic disappointment and a commercial flop.

In 2005 he finished at No. 459 in the Flemish version of The Greatest Belgian, outside the official nomination list. In 2006 King Albert II awarded Berghmans the title Commander in the Order of the Crown. On 27 March 2009 Gaston Berghmans received the Flemish TV Stars Career Star 2009 during a Flemish Television Academy gala.

Film career

 Christmas in Paris (2008)
 Dief! (1998) .... Bompa Van Reeth
 She Good Fighter (1995) .... Rick
 Gaston en Leo in Hong Kong (1988) .... Gaston
 Paniekzaaiers (1986) .... Gaston
 Zware jongens (1984) .... Gaston Berghmans
 De Witte van Sichem (1980) .... Nand
 Pallieter (1976) .... Veldwachter
 De stille genieter (1961) .... Gaston Somers
 De Duivel te slim (1960) .... Pol
 Hoe zotter, hoe liever (1960) .... Mil
 Een Zonde waard (1959) .... Tony Dertien

References

External links

Belgian male comedians
Belgian stand-up comedians
1926 births
2016 deaths
20th-century Flemish male actors
Flemish male stage actors
Flemish male film actors